Zenkner Valley is a valley in the U.S. state of Washington.

Zenkner Valley was named after Austin Zenkner, who settled in the valley in 1880.

References

Landforms of Lewis County, Washington
Landforms of Thurston County, Washington
Valleys of Washington (state)